Albert Bauer ( – ) was a professional baseball player. A pitcher, he played in two seasons in Major League Baseball for the Columbus Buckeyes and the St. Louis Maroons.

Professional career

Columbus Buckeyes
At the age of 25 Bauer made his professional debut with the Chillicothe Logans of the Ohio State League in 1884. He was acquired by the Columbus Buckeyes of the American Association in September. He went 1–2 on the season with 13 strikeouts with a 4.68 ERA in three games, all starts.

St. Louis Maroons
After playing for the Atlanta team in the Southern League in 1885, Bauer joined the St. Louis Maroons in 1886. In four games, all starts, Bauer would go 0–4 with 13 strikeouts and a 5.97 ERA in 28 innings pitched. After pitching in the minors again in 1887, Bauer left professional baseball.

External links

Career statistics and bio at Baseball Almanac

1859 births
1944 deaths
19th-century baseball players
Major League Baseball pitchers
Columbus Buckeyes players
St. Louis Maroons players
Chillicothe Logans players
Atlanta Atlantas players
Topeka Capitals players
Clark College alumni
Columbus Buckeyes (minor league) players
Baseball players from Columbus, Ohio